Sato or Satō is a Japanese surname.

Sato may also refer to:

Places
 Sato, Kagoshima, a former town in Kagoshima Prefecture, Japan
 Sato, Tibet, a village

People
, Japanese baseball player
 Romain Sato (born 1981), Central African basketball player
 "Mr. Sato" (stagename), ring name for wrestler Akio Sato (wrestler)

Other uses
 Sato (beverage), a beverage from Thailand
 Sato Project, an organization that finds homes in the US for Puerto Rico's feral dogs
 Sato (instrument), a bowed tanbur, or long-necked lute of Central Asian origin
 Sato (supermarket), a Japanese supermarket
 "S.A.T.O.", a song from Ozzy Osbourne's 1981 album Diary of a Madman
 SATO, a brand of toilet products for users of pit latrines and also SATO Tap.  Part of LIXIL
 Sato Pharmaceutical, a Japanese pharmaceutical company

See also
 Satou Sabally (born 1998), German women's basketball player

 
 
 

Japanese-language surnames